Pusan National University School of Law is one of the professional graduate schools of Pusan National University, located in Busan, South Korea. Founded in 2009, it is one of the founding law schools in South Korea and is one of the larger schools with each class in the three-year J.D. program having approximately 120 students.

Programs

References

Website 
 [law.pusan.ac.kr Official website]

Suwon
Law schools in South Korea
Educational institutions established in 2009
2009 establishments in South Korea
ko:부산대학교 법학전문대학원